"Try to Follow Me" (also known as "Follow Me") is a song by South Korean girl group 2NE1. It was originally released on February 9, 2010, to promote Samsung's "Corby CF" mobile phone. It later was released with the album "To Anyone" in September, 2010.

History

The song was announced as a promotional single for Samsung's new phone, "Corby CF", just hours before the song's release.

On South Korea's official Gaon music charts, "Try to Follow Me" managed to land at number one for the weeks of February 7 to February 13, 2010, but dropped in the following weeks. By the end of 2010 "Try to Follow Me" was downloaded over 1,770,000 times plus an additional 650,000 copies sold in 2011, for a total of over 2,400,000 digital copies sold.

Music video
There was no video planned for 2NE1's "Try to Follow Me" but since the popularity of the song, a video was made. This video premiered March 11, 2010. It was filmed by Seo Hyun Seung sometime in February, the girls self-choreographed their dance parts.

It begins with CL in a suit singing the introduction. After, it shows CL and Dara sharing a motorcycle, then changes to, Minzy and Bom sharing another motorcycle. The verses shows, CL sealed onto a metal bathtub what is upside down with different cameras around her and in her second verse she is wearing a polka dot wig doing a dance. Bom shows her new edgy hair style and in her second verse, it shows her in her own high fashioned clothing. Minzy dances in front of a screen and in her second verse, it shows her laughing at her other self and dancing to the rhythm. Later on, Dara is seen with a gun-blaster as she fights against two Star Wars storm soldiers (later revealed to be CL and Minzy). When Dara shoots the camera with the blaster, it shows all the members in a jungle scene doing a dance. At the end, it shows all of the members dressed up like old fashioned-actresses playing with their feather boas. They do a dance going into each other and then the members change clothes into hip-hop clothing then the song ends (as the song ends it shows CL blowing bubbles and with the scene of the cameras, but normally this was cut out from Korean music channels and the TV show 2NE1 TV).

Charts

Year-end chart

References

External links
 
 

2010 singles
2NE1 songs
YG Entertainment singles
Songs written by Teddy Park
Korean-language songs
Gaon Digital Chart number-one singles
2010 songs